A party princess is a person who entertains children at birthday parties, often dressed as different Disney characters especially those from the Disney Princess franchise. The most common party princess costumes are Elsa, Cinderella, Rapunzel, Aurora, and Ariel. These types of princess character entertainers are usually hired through children's birthday party entertainment planners. Party princesses generally perform at private birthday parties for young girls: they sing, dance, and play with kids as well as mingle with other guests, all the while maintaining a party theme based on the character they are dressed up as.

Legal issues
Party princesses often face issues due to their use of Disney intellectual property, putting their business in a legal gray area. While most of the stories from the Disney Princess line are adapted from public domain fairy tales and folk stories, individual portrayals are protected by copyright. This has presented an issue with companies engaged in the use of costumed characters for children's parties due to Disney's mind share especially with children who are more likely to recognize a Disney princess than their original folk tale counterpart, such as with Characters for Hire whom Disney filed a lawsuit due to their unauthorized use of Star Wars characters. The New York federal court did however refuse to grant summary judgement in favor of Disney, as the judge ruled that there was no visible attempt at confusing customers over whether Characters for Hire misrepresented Disney, also noting that the company website has referred to Princess Leia and Chewbacca euphemistically as "The Princess" and "Big Hairy Guy" respectively.

References

Entertainment occupations
Parties
Birthdays
Gendered occupations
Disney fandom
Disney Princess
Disney controversies
Cosplay
Children's entertainers